James Philbrook was an American actor who appeared in several major films, including I Want to Live! (1958), Woman Obsessed and as Colonel Tall in the 1964 war picture The Thin Red Line. He had supporting roles on television, including The Islanders (1960–61) and The New Loretta Young Show (1962 - 1963).

Early years
Philbrook was born on October 22, 1924 at Davenport, Iowa, the son of Roland F. Philbrook, a clergyman. He attended St. Ambrose University and the University of Iowa, eventually completing an electrical engineering degree from the Massachusetts Institute of Technology in 1946.

A December 26, 1962, newspaper article reported on Philbrook's varied occupational experiences: "At various times, he's been a miner, a rodeo performer, a gym instructor, a writer, a photographer — you name, he's done it with various degrees of success."

Military service
Philbrook was an aviation electronics specialist for the Navy for four years during the Korean War. He was stationed in Africa, the Aleutian Islands, China, Europe, and India.

Early roles
Philbrook's first screen role was at the age of thirty-two on CBS's Alfred Hitchcock Presents as a town clerk in the 1957 episode "The West Warlock Time Capsule", with Henry Jones in the starring role. A few months later, Philbrook appeared in "The Les Rand Story" of NBC's western series, Wagon Train, with Eduard Franz in the episode lead role. He also appeared in the 1957 episode "Decoy" of the syndicated western series Man Without a Gun, starring Rex Reason. In 1958, Philbrook guest starred in two ABC and Warner Brothers western series, Maverick, starring James Garner and Diane Brewster, in the role of Sloan in the episode "The Seventh Hand," and Sugarfoot as Smokey in "A Wreath for Charity Lloyd". He portrayed Clem Harrison in the 1958 episode "Manhunt" of ABC's Broken Arrow, starring John Lupton and Michael Ansara.

In 1958, Philbrook played Charles Stewart in the episode "Hit and Run" of the syndicated television series, How to Marry a Millionaire, based on the earlier Marilyn Monroe film and starring Barbara Eden and Merry Anders. In 1959, Philbrook appeared as Yancey Lewis in "Return to Friendly" of the CBS western The Texan, starring Rory Calhoun. He starred too as Hank in "The Trap" of the syndicated series Rescue 8, starring Jim Davis and Lang Jeffries. He also appeared as Bender in the 1959 episode "Domestic Katy" of the CBS sitcom. The Ann Sothern Show. That same year, he appeared as an unidentified man, with Sothern and Pat Carroll, in the CBS anthology series The DuPont Show with June Allyson. Later that year, Philbrook made his first of two guest appearances on Perry Mason as murderer Harry Jonson in "The Case of the Lame Canary."  He also appeared as Politician Harrison Burke in the 1963 episode, "The Case of the Velvet Claws."

Philbrook procured his first recurring role in a series as Zack Malloy on The Islanders, with co-star William Reynolds (born 1931) in the role of Sandy Wade. The two played owners of an airplane that can land in water. The series is set in the Spice Islands of Indonesia. Diane Brewster appeared in a few of the twenty-five episodes of the series.

After The Islanders, Philbrook portrayed Steve Banks, a New York City insurance investigator, in all thirteen episodes of The Investigators, with co-stars James Franciscus, Mary Murphy as Maggie Peters, and Alan Austin as Bill Davis.

Later career
Philbrook appeared five times in different roles from 1958-1961 on the original NBC The Loretta Young Show, also called the Letter to Loretta anthology series. Among those roles are Mike Roberts in "A Visit to Sao Paulo" and Wainwright Tyler in "Doesn't Everybody?" In 1962, he was cast as magazine publisher and romantic interest of Loretta Young on The New Loretta Young Show. The couple married in the twenty-sixth and final episode of the series. Young played Christine Massey, a widowed mother of seven children, some grown, and Philbrook, according to the story line, adapted to the idea of becoming a stepfather to so many. Actors playing the Massey children included twins Dack Rambo and Dirk Rambo, Beverly Washburn, and Sandy Descher.

Philbrook's other appearances were as Jim Costain in the 1961 segment "Triple C" of NBC's anthology series The Barbara Stanwyck Show and as McWhorter in the 1962 episode "Inger, My Love" on Bonanza. He appeared in two 1965 films, as Adam Hyde in Finger on the Trigger and as James "Ace" Ketchum in Son of a Gunfighter.

Philbrook starred in the 1962 film The Wild Westerners and the 1966 Spaghetti Western Two Thousand Dollars for Coyote.

Philbrook's last English language role was as Dr. Keller in the 1966 episode "The Blind Man's Bluff Raid" of ABC's The Rat Patrol, a World War II drama starring Christopher George. His final film roles between 1966 and 1975 were all produced in Europe, most of which were spaghetti westerns.

Personal life
Philbrook was married to the former Frances Cassling. They had four children.

Death
Philbrook died in October 24, 1982 at Los Angeles, California.

Filmography

Notes

References

External links
 
 
 

American male television actors
American male film actors
Actors from Davenport, Iowa
Male actors from Los Angeles
20th-century American male actors
MIT School of Engineering alumni
1924 births
1984 deaths